Jean Boudehen (January 11, 1939 – September 4, 1982) was a French sprint canoer who competed in the 1960s. Competing in two Summer Olympics, he won the silver medal in the C-2 1000 m event at Tokyo in 1964.

References
Jean Boudehen's profile at Sports Reference.com

External links
 

1939 births
1982 deaths
Canoeists at the 1964 Summer Olympics
Canoeists at the 1968 Summer Olympics
French male canoeists
Olympic canoeists of France
Olympic silver medalists for France
Olympic medalists in canoeing
Medalists at the 1964 Summer Olympics